James Bruce (1730–1794) was a Scottish traveller and travel writer.

James Bruce may also refer to:

 James Bruce (bishop) (died 1447), Bishop of Dunkeld, Chancellor of Scotland and Bishop of Glasgow
 James Bruce (minister) (c. 1660–1730), Irish Presbyterian minister
 James Bruce (comptroller) (c. 1670 – c. 1732), Member of Parliament for Marlborough and joint comptroller of British Army accounts
 Sir James Bruce (Chief Justice) (1691–1749), Chief Justice of Barbados
 Sir James Bruce, 2nd Baronet (1788–1836), Irish soldier
 Jacob Bruce (1669–1735), or James Bruce, Russian field-marshal, founder of the Russian branch of the Scottish family
 James Bruce (1732–1791), Governor general of Saint Petersburg and last male member of the Russian branch
 James Bruce, 8th Earl of Elgin (1811–1863), Anglo-Scottish diplomat
 Sir James Andrew Thomas Bruce (1846–1921), Royal Navy admiral
 James Bruce (English cricketer) (born 1979), English cricketer
 James Bruce (Zimbabwean cricketer) (born 1993), Zimbabwean cricketer
 James Bruce (farmer) (1927–2013), Scottish farmer and forester
 James Bruce (1769–1798), Member of Parliament for Marlborough
 James E. Bruce (1927–2008), politician in the American state of Kentucky
 James Cabell Bruce (1892–1980), American businessman and banker, and U.S. ambassador to Argentina
 J. W. Bruce (James William Bruce, born 1952), British mathematician

See also 
 James Bruce Falls
 James Bruce Round Barn, Freeport, United States